Van Houten's Landing Historic District is a national historic district located at Upper Nyack in Rockland County, New York.  It encompasses 50 contributing buildings and two contributing structures in the historic core of Upper Nyack. The district developed after 1798 and includes notable examples of Greek Revival and Italianate style architecture.  Located in the district is the separately listed Upper Nyack Firehouse.  Other notable buildings include the Village Hall (c. 1870), John Lydecker House (c. 1814, 1830), C.A. Fellows House (c. 1840), James P. Vorhis House (c. 1884), Gilchrest House (c. 1820, 1890), and Voorhis Store (c. 1884).

It was listed on the National Register of Historic Places in 2004.

References

Historic districts on the National Register of Historic Places in New York (state)
Houses on the National Register of Historic Places in New York (state)
Italianate architecture in New York (state)
Greek Revival architecture in New York (state)
Historic districts in Rockland County, New York
Houses in Rockland County, New York
National Register of Historic Places in Rockland County, New York